Alya Rohali (born 1 December 1976) is an Indonesian film and soap opera actress, television show host, notary, model and a beauty pageant titleholder, who was crowned Puteri Indonesia 1996, She represented Indonesia at the Miss Universe 1996 pageant. She was the first (and only) person to hold the title of  Puteri Indonesia (i.e., the Indonesian representative to all of the international beauty competitions) to hold the title for four consecutive years (1996, 1997, 1998 and 1999).

Early life and career

Alya Rohali was born in Jakarta on 1 December 1976, the fourth child to Rohali Sani and his wife Atit Tresnawati. She received her Bachelor of Law degree from Trisakti University. She was one of the witness to the riots engendered by the 12 May 1998 shooting of 4 university students. Despite being within the campus, she became a victim of tear gas used by the security forces to control the rioters at the university gates.

Fellow model Okky Asokawati guided Rohali during the initial period of her modelling career. She was crowned Puteri Indonesia 1996 and represented her country at Miss Universe 1996 beauty pageant but could not make it to the Final 10. Previous Indonesian representatives were sent as Observers. However, Rohali was made a participant and her wearing a swimsuit at the event was received negatively by Indonesian media. She received threats and was eventually attacked by people for whom her participation in the event was an "immoral activity". Mien Sugandhi former state Ministry of Women Empowerment and Child Protection (who later dethroned), criticised the event and called her participation in it an "insult to the government". It was not until 2005, that Indonesia was represented at Miss Universe pageant.

Helmy Yahya and Rohali hosted the popular TV quiz show Siapa Berani?.Together they won the Panasonic Gobel Awards 2002 in the "Best Male and Female Quiz Show Host category". Rohali, following her transition to television roles, has been cited as the "most successful" Indonesian beauty pageant winner who entered the entertainment industry. After she reduced her weight by 10 kg in 2 months, a slimming center appointed her its celebrity spokesperson. Rohali holds a Master's degree in Law from University of Indonesia. She's also a notary.

Rohali made her film debut with Jose Poernomo-directed drama Moga Bunda Disayang Allah (2013). Her second film role in Di Balik 98 (2015), earned her a nomination in Best Supporting Actress category at the Indonesian Box Office Movie Awards 2016.

Personal life
Rohali married Eri Surya Kelana in 1999 and has a daughter from him. However their marriage did not last long and the couple separated in 2003. Three years after the divorce, she married a Madurese businessman Faiz Ramzy Rachbini. Their second child was born on 10 October 2010.

Filmography
Rohali has acted on several television series and film, she is also presenting some TV Show programme.

Movie

TV Series

TV Show

Awards and nomination

See also

 Puteri Indonesia
 Miss Universe 1996
 Susanty Priscilla Adresina Manuhutu

References

Bibliography

External links
 
 
 Official Puteri Indonesia Official Website
 Official Miss Universe Official Website

Living people
1976 births
Puteri Indonesia winners
Miss Universe 1996 contestants
Indonesian beauty pageant winners
Indonesian film actresses
Indonesian television actresses
Indonesian female models
Indonesian activists
Notaries
Trisakti University alumni
University of Indonesia alumni
People from Jakarta